Sunquest Information Systems Inc. is a U.S. developer of medical laboratory and diagnostic information solutions, with a user base of hospitals and commercial laboratories.

In 1996, Sunquest acquired Antrim Corporation, a developer of turnkey laboratory information management software, including MUMPS applications. In 2001, Sunquest was acquired by UK company Misys plc. In 2012, Roper Technologies acquired Sunquest.

Sunquest offers a range of software products with an emphasis on laboratory information management systems. These includes clinical diagnostic data management, blood bank data management, molecular diagnostics analysis and reporting, and multi-laboratory inter-connectivity.

Sunquest introduced the concept of the Five Rights of Laboratory Testing(tm)  in 2008 to help establish the importance of the laboratory in healthcare.

Products
Sunquest markets various healthcare information solutions related to the diagnostic laboratory. Their customers are in the field of laboratory medicine and include such healthcare providers as Henry Ford Health System, The Cleveland Clinic, University of Pittsburgh Medical Center Public Health Authority (Bahamas), Cancer Treatment Centers of America, Massachusetts General Hospital, and the Department of Health and Medical Services in the United Arab Emirates.

Sunquest offers a range of diagnostic laboratory information systems (LIS). In addition to providing services for general laboratory, the company addresses the need for managing workflow in the specialty areas of microbiology, blood bank, and pathology as well as sub-specialties of virology, molecular diagnostics, cytogenetics. The suite includes business solutions as well, to provide the laboratory and hospital management teams with actionable data (KPIs) to manage laboratory performance, adjust staff schedules, and justify changes in the list of tests that are offered by the laboratory.

The Sunquest portfolio includes Collection and Transfusion Manager. These barcode point of care (BPOC) solutions ensure that lab specimens are not confused and that blood units are transfused to the patients for which they are intended. Combined with the Blood Bank system, they form a Closed Loop Transfusion Management System(tm). Hospitals implementing the system report specimen identification errors reduce to zero while bringing significant workflow efficiencies for laboratory and nursing personnel.
 
Sunquest purchased the Outreach Advantage(r) suite from Pathology Associates Medical Laboratory (PAML) in January 2009.
 
Outreach Advantage was the second major acquisition to be completed during the first full year following Sunquest's re-emergence as an independent, privately owned company. The first, in November 2008, brought the Sunquest ICE (Integrated Clinical Environment) solution set to the company's portfolio. ICE enables communication with all installed Patient administration systems (PASs), Laboratory information management systems (LIMSs) and RISs. Both product suites facilitate high levels of connectivity between hospitals and community physicians and patients. In the United Kingdom, ICE is used in over 90 acute national Trusts to meet ordering and reporting requirements.

History
Sunquest Information Systems Inc. was founded in 1979, as a privately owned company by pathologist Dr. Sidney Goldblatt. In June 1996, the company began publicly trading on NASDAQ as SUNQ and also acquired Antrim, a commercial laboratory and financial information system supplier. Sunquest itself was acquired in 2001 by UK-based public company Misys plc, and became the Hospital Systems Division of Misys Healthcare.
 
In October 2007, the diagnostic information portion of the Misys business was spun off and acquired by Vista Equity Partners of San Francisco. Upon re-emerging as a privately held, independent business, Sunquest took its original name and was thus immediately recognized in the diagnostic laboratory market space based on its long-term success and established reputation.

In 2012, Sunquest was acquired by Roper Technologies.

Five Rights of Laboratory Testing™

The Five Rights of Laboratory Testing™ is a concept introduced in 2008 by Sunquest Information Systems that emphasizes the importance of the role that diagnostic laboratories play in patient safety. It shares synergies with the five rights of medication administration, which care providers are taught to ensure patient safety when giving a patient drugs in a healthcare setting. The Five Rights of Laboratory Testing™ can also be tied to the Patient's Bill of Rights.

The Five Rights of Laboratory Testing™ says that patients have the right to know that they are having the right test performed, that the test being performed is meant for them (they are the right patient), it is being performed at the right time and for the right reasons (or indicators) and ultimately that those tests provide an accurate diagnosis upon which the patient and care team can make informed make therapeutic decisions.

Right test: Assurance that the test being performed is the one that the physician requested as part of the treatment plan.

Right patient: Busy hospitals and emergency departments can mistake patient identity, usually due to manual processes that are executed  or bypassed  under stressful conditions. Technology solutions have proven to provide safeguards that prevent identification errors.

Right time: Certain elements must be tested at an exact time in order to make effective diagnostic and treatment decisions, such as altering drug dosage amounts. Another facet of this concept is that the test is performed at the right juncture in the patient's life – at a point when the information created can be acted upon to maximize outcomes.

Right indicators: Patients and care providers should be confident that previously reported laboratory results are accurate and trustworthy. The care provider needs full access to prior results regardless of when or where they were performed. Both patients and providers should be certain that the test being considered or evaluated is pertinent to the actual or suspected diagnosis. These factors all play into indicating what confirmatory or follow-up testing needs to be performed.

Right diagnosis: Laboratory testing influences nearly 70% of diagnostic decisions (although it accounts for less than 3% of the healthcare dollars spent in the U.S.). Patients have the right to be given the right diagnosis in order to make informed decisions with their care providers about care and treatment plans. Increasingly, the complexity of laboratory testing in the form of molecular and genetic testing will drive a transformation in healthcare delivery as it is practiced in the U.S., creating a culture where pathologists and laboratory professionals are embraced by their clinical counterparts as vital members of the patient care team.

References

Software companies based in Arizona
Medical technology companies of the United States
Companies based in Tucson, Arizona
Defunct software companies of the United States